Coleophora galbulipennella is a moth of the family Coleophoridae or leaf miners. It is known from Europe, where it is found from Sweden to Spain, Italy and Greece and from Great Britain to southern Russia.

The moth flies in August depending on the location.

The larvae feed on Silene nutans, Silene otites, Silene italica, Arenaria grandiflora, Cerastium arvense and Lychnis viscaria. Silene nutans can sometimes be found in the UK National Vegetation Classification habitat communities: the very widespread MG1 (Arrhenatherum elatius grassland), and thus can be found where Arrhenatherum elatius, (also known as false oat grass), and/or Dactylis glomerata, (cock's-foot), occurs. The case is yellowish white, with several characteristic dark length lines. The mouth angle is about 40°.

References

External links
 

galbulipennella
Moths described in 1838
Moths of Europe
Taxa named by Philipp Christoph Zeller